Count Ludwig August Mellin (23 January 1754 in Tuhala, Governorate of Reval – 12 March 1835 in Riga, Governorate of Livonia) was a Baltic German politician, cartographer, writer and publicist. He is best known for creating the first professional atlas visualizing Livonia (area now divided between Estonia and Latvia), the Atlas von Liefland, oder von den beyden Gouvernementern u. Herzogthümern Lief- und Ehstland, und der Provinz Oesel in 1798.

He was born in Tuhala, Estonia. He visited Riga in 1782. Mellin, a soldier in the Imperial Russian Army, became a cartographer at the request of Paul I of Russia, who wanted to see a map of Livonia. Since a professional map did not exist, Mellin was put in charge of creating it. In 1798, the Atlas von Liefland, oder von den beyden Gouvernementern u. Herzogthümern Lief- und Ehstland, und der Provinz Oesel, was published by Mellin. It took 28 years to complete it. Mellin used maps from private collections, the military, and the Russian Academy of Sciences. The map shows natural features such as islands, geology and shorelines of the region. The maps were so popular they were sold overseas. At one point, Mellin was accused of espionage because of where the maps were being sold. He was arrested. Paul I had the maps pulled off the market.

References

1754 births
1835 deaths
People from Kose Parish
People from the Governorate of Estonia
Baltic-German people
German cartographers
Cartographers from the Russian Empire
Politicians of the Russian Empire
Estophiles